Launch Complex 12 (LC-12) at Cape Canaveral Space Force Station, Florida was a launch pad used by Atlas rockets and missiles between 1958 and 1967. It was the second-most southern of the pads known as Missile Row, between LC-11 to the south and LC-13 to the north. Along with Complexes 11, 13 and 14, 12 featured a more robust design than many contemporary pads, due to the greater power of the Atlas compared to other rockets of the time. The rockets were delivered to the launch pad by means of a ramp on the southwest side of the launch pedestal.

Atlas A, C and D missiles were tested from the site. It was also used for orbital launches of Atlas-Able and later Atlas-Agena rockets, and two Project FIRE suborbital tests for Project Apollo, using Atlas D rockets.

LC-12's first launch was Atlas 10A on January 10, 1958. During the second half of the year, a larger umbilical service tower was built in preparation for the C series Atlas tests, flown from December 1958 to August 1959.

On 24 September 1959, the first Atlas-Able, 9C, exploded during a static firing test at LC-12, after a turbopump on one of the engines failed to trigger a complete engine shutdown. The damaged turbopump continued to allow oxidizer to flow, feeding the fire beneath the vehicle. About a minute later the rocket suffered a structural failure, collapsed and exploded. The entire service tower and both umbilical towers were knocked over and the concrete launch stand caved in. Because damage to LC-12 was so extensive, it did not host another launch until Missile 56D in May 1960. The large service tower was not rebuilt following the explosion of Atlas 9C. It then hosted more ICBM tests along with the second and third Atlas Able probes.

In 1961, LC-12 was converted to support the Atlas-Agena rocket. The first Atlas-Agena launch from LC-12 was in August 1961.

On 27 August 1962, Mariner 2 was launched by Atlas-Agena B 179D, the first spacecraft conduct a successful flyby of another planet when it flew past Venus on 14 December 1962. On 28 July 1964, Atlas-Agena B 250D launched Ranger 7, which was the first fully successful Ranger mission. On 28 November 1964, Atlas-Agena D 288D launched with Mariner 4, which provided the first close-up pictures of Mars.

In 1967, LC-12 became the third of the four Atlas pads to be deactivated. Following deactivation, the launch tower, mobile service structure and launch support equipment were dismantled, and the site is no longer maintained.

References
Encyclopedia Astronautica - LC12

Cape Canaveral Space Force Station